Kurima is a village and municipality in the Bardejov District in the Prešov Region of north-east Slovakia.

History
In historical records the village was first mentioned in 1270.

Geography
It has a population of about 1065 people

External links
 
https://web.archive.org/web/20070427022352/http://www.statistics.sk/mosmis/eng/run.html

Villages and municipalities in Bardejov District
Šariš